Ashleigh Julia Ball (born 25 March 1986 in Brighton) is a field hockey player. She is an Olympic bronze medallist and a member of both the Women's Great Britain and England hockey teams.

Born in Brighton, Ball went to school in Cheltenham and attended Leeds University where she studied medical science and nutrition, and made her international hockey debut in 2008. Since then Ball has earned 48 caps for England and 30 caps for Great Britain. Ball was part of the women's England hockey team of 2010 that won the World Cup, Commonwealth Games and Champions Trophy bronze medals. She won a bronze medal at the 2012 Summer Olympics, scoring two minutes before half-time in the 3–0 victory over Belgium during the qualifying stages of the games.

Ball has played club hockey for Slough, Bowdon Hightown and Bradford. Ball is managed by The Hub Entertainment.

References

External links 
 
 
 

Living people
Alumni of the University of Leeds
British female field hockey players
Field hockey players at the 2012 Summer Olympics
Olympic field hockey players of Great Britain
Olympic medalists in field hockey
Olympic bronze medallists for Great Britain
English female field hockey players
1986 births
Medalists at the 2012 Summer Olympics
Commonwealth Games medallists in field hockey
Commonwealth Games bronze medallists for England
Field hockey players at the 2010 Commonwealth Games
Medallists at the 2010 Commonwealth Games